The 1995 EA Generali Open, also known as Austrian Open, was a men's tennis tournament held at the Kitzbüheler Tennisclub in Kitzbühel, Austria and played on outdoor clay courts. The event was part of the World Series of the 1995 ATP Tour. It was the 25th edition of the tournament and was held from 31 July until 7 August 1995. Fifth-seeded Albert Costa won the singles title.

Finals

Singles

 Albert Costa defeated  Thomas Muster, 4–6, 6–4, 7–6(7–3), 2–6, 6–4
 It was Costa's first singles title of his career.

Doubles

 Francisco Montana /  Greg Van Emburgh defeated  Jordi Arrese /  Wayne Arthurs 6–7, 6–3, 7–6

References

External links
 ATP tournament profile
 ITF tournament edition details

Austrian Open (tennis)
Austrian Open Kitzbühel
Austrian Open